Keela International is a Scottish clothing manufacturer, mainly making clothes suitable for outdoor activities.

History
The company was incorporated in March 1989. It won The Queen's Award for Enterprise: Innovation (Technology) (2008).

Structure
It is headquartered in Glenrothes.

Products
It makes jackets for outdoor activities, as well as cold weather and waterproof clothing for the UK emergency services and armed forces.

See also
 Mammut Sports Group of Switzerland
 Rohan (clothing) of Milton Keynes

References

External links
 Keela

British companies established in 1989
Clothing companies of Scotland
Clothing manufacturers
Outdoor clothing brands